Homona blaiki is a species of moth of the family Tortricidae first described by Józef Razowski in 2013. It is found on Seram and in New Caledonia. The habitat consists of alluvial forests, Eucalyptus forests, bamboo and secondary forests.

The wingspan is about 21 mm for males and 30 mm for females. There is some external variation in adults, especially in males. Some specimens have blackish-brown and brown forewings, while others have a yellow-brown colouration and better developed brownish markings.

Etymology
The species is named for Dr. Tomasz Blaik who collected the species.

References

Moths described in 2013
Homona (moth)